Fort Bonneville was a fortified winter camp and fur trading post near present-day Pinedale, Wyoming established  in 1832 by Captain Benjamin Bonneville. Bonneville's party was engaged in the exploration of Wyoming, crossing the South Pass with 110 men and about 20 wagons. Bonneville completed the stockade on the Green River on August 9, 1832. Heavy fall snows caused Bonneville to reconsider the site, and the party abandoned it, leading the place to become known as Bonneville's Folly or Fort Nonsense. Bonneville moved on to the Salmon River in Idaho for the winter. The Green River site functioned as a rendezvous until the party returned east in 1835.

No structure remains at the site, which is marked by an inscribed boulder placed by the Daughters of the American Revolution.

The site was placed on the National Register of Historic Places in 1970.

References

Bonneville
Bonneville
Buildings and structures in Sublette County, Wyoming
Trading posts in the United States
Exploration of North America
National Register of Historic Places in Sublette County, Wyoming